The Fiat C-platform was an automobile platform used in small family cars of the Fiat Group. The predecessors of the C-platform were the Type Three and Type Two platforms, and the successor is the new Compact platform which debuted in Alfa Romeo Giulietta in 2010.

First generation (C1)
The first generation C-platform was no more of a lightly developed Type Two platform: it retained almost all of its structure (including the wheelbase in most models) and components, including the suspension layout, albeit with some revisions. It is also called "Type Two rev. 2". As in the Type Two platform, the suspension is independent all-around, composed of MacPherson struts at the front and trailing arms at the rear.
The first models to use this platform were the Fiat Bravo and Fiat Brava, followed by the Fiat Marea. The Fiat Multipla is built on the sandwich version of this platform.

Vehicles based on Fiat C1 platform
 1995 Fiat Brava
 1995 Fiat Bravo
 1996 Fiat Marea
 1998 Fiat Multipla

Type Two rev. 3
The  Alfa Romeo 156 and Lancia Lybra used a development of the C1 platform, called "Type Two rev. 3", with an extended wheelbase and a different suspension setup: double wishbones at the front and MacPherson struts at the rear for the Alfa; MacPherson struts at the front and BLG ("Bracci Longitudinali Guidati", translating to "Guided Longitudinal Arms") multilink rear suspension for the Lancia. The Alfa Romeo 147 and Alfa Romeo GT were derived from the 156 floorpan and retained its suspension setup. Estate versions of 156 and Lybra were also available with Boge-Nivomat self-levelling hydropneumatic rear suspension. Alfa 156, with its Sportwagon Q4 and Crosswagon Q4, is the only C-platform based car with all-wheel drive.

Vehicles based on Fiat Type Two rev. 3
 1996 Alfa Romeo 156
 1998 Lancia Lybra
 2000 Alfa Romeo 147
 2003 Alfa Romeo GT

Second generation (C2)
The second generation C-platform was jointly designed by global team of Fiat engineers and small number of Lancia engineers in Fiat development center in Mirafiori, also engineers in Betim, Brazil took part of the development. This all-new chassis uses MacPherson strut front suspension and torsion beam rear suspension.

The first model to use this platform was the Fiat Stilo. Between 2007 and 2008 the C-platform was used by the new Fiat Bravo and the new third generation Lancia Delta with longer wheelbase. The C-platform was built in Cassino (Italy) and Betim to be used for the Brazilian versions of Stilo.

The C-platform supports many of Fiat engines from 1.2 FIRE petrol to 1.9 diesel MultiJet TwinTurbo.

Vehicles based on Fiat C2 platform
 2001 Fiat Stilo (short wheelbase)
 2002 Fiat Stilo Multiwagon (short wheelbase)
 2007 Fiat Bravo (short wheelbase)
 2008 Lancia Delta (long wheelbase)

References

C
C
C